Anthony John Roberts (born 19 April 1970) is an Australian politician. He is the New South Wales Minister for Planning and the Minister for Homes in the Perrottet ministry since December 2021. Roberts is a member of the New South Wales Legislative Assembly representing Lane Cove for the Liberal Party since 2003.

He has previously served as the Minister for Counter Terrorism and Corrections in the second Berejiklian and Perrottet ministries, from April 2019 to December 2021; as the Minister for Planning, the Minister for Housing, and the Special Minister of State from 2017 until 2019 in the first Berejiklian ministry; and the Minister for Industry, Resources and Energy between 2015 and 2017 in the second Baird government; as the Minister for Resources and Energy and the Special Minister of State, between 2013 and 2015 in the first Baird government; and as the Minister for Fair Trading in the O'Farrell government.

Prior to entering politics, Roberts was a director of the public relations firm Flagship Communications.

Early life
Roberts was educated at Saint Ignatius' College, Riverview and the University of Technology, Sydney.

Roberts was elected to Lane Cove Council and served as a Councillor between 1995 and 2003, including a term serving as Deputy Mayor and two terms as Mayor, between 1999 and 2000 and between 2001 and 2002.

Political adviser
Between 1992 and 1996, Roberts was employed as an adviser to the Hon Dr Brian Pezzutti MP, and between 1996 and 2003, Roberts was employed as an electorate officer to then Prime Minister, John Howard. In the book Jonestown: The Power and the Myth of Alan Jones, journalist Chris Masters claimed that Roberts was employed to act as a liaison between the office and Sydney radio broadcaster Alan Jones. Australian online political magazine Crikey.com gave Roberts the title, "Minister for Alan Jones".

Orange Grove accusations
After Roberts was elected to Parliament in 2003, Flagship Communications acted on behalf of owners of the Orange Grove site. Former NSW Premier Bob Carr claimed in 2004 that, "there appeared to be a warm relationship between Gazcorp and Mr Roberts, evidenced by a stream of faxes and emails giving the Liberal MP questions to ask of the Labor Party about the factory outlet". On 14 September 2004, Roberts said in Parliament that he had ceased being a director of Flagship Communications prior to being elected to Parliament and had never received any payment from Flagship Communications.

Political career
Roberts left Howard's office when he was elected as the Member for Lane Cove in 2003, following the retirement of Kerry Chikarovski. Roberts was re-elected in 2007, increasing his margin from 3.2 per cent to 12.4 per cent.

Following the 2007 election, in May 2008 Roberts was appointed as Shadow Minister for Emergency Services and Juvenile Justice and in December 2008, was moved from these portfolios and was subsequently appointed Shadow Minister for the Arts, Citizenship and Volunteering.

On 24 April 2010, Roberts was unanimously endorsed by the Liberal Party to contest the 2011 state election. He was re-elected to Lane Cove with a swing of 13.4 points and won the seat with 77.3 per cent of the two-party vote. His main opponent was Mario Tsang, representing Labor. Subsequent to the election, on 3 April 2011, Roberts was appointed Minister for Fair Trading.

Following the resignation of Chris Hartcher from Cabinet 4 December 2013, Fair Trading Minister Anthony Roberts was appointed as Minister for Resources and Energy and Special Minister of State. Stuart Ayres was  appointed to succeed Roberts in his Fair Trading portfolio. Following the resignation of Barry O'Farrell as Premier, and the subsequent ministerial reshuffle by Mike Baird, the new Liberal Leader, in April 2014, Roberts assumed the role of Leader of the House in the Legislative Assembly, in addition to his Ministerial responsibilities. Following the 2015 state election, Roberts was sworn in as the Minister for Industry, Resources and Energy, and retained his role as Leader of the House. In this role, Roberts was tasked with the creation of 150,000 jobs in NSW over four years, promoting industry development in NSW and leading the newly created Department of Industry, Skills and Regional Development.

Following the resignation of Mike Baird as Premier, Gladys Berejiklian was elected as Liberal leader and sworn in as Premier. The Berejiklian ministry was subsequently formed with Roberts sworn in as the Minister for Planning, the Minister for Housing, and the Special Minister of State with effect from 30 January 2017. He retained his responsibilities as the Leader of the House. In the second Berejiklian ministry, Roberts served as the Minister for Counter Terrorism and Corrections, from April 2019 through to the second rearrangement of the Perrottet ministry in December 2021. He was subsequently sworn in as the Minister for Planning and the Minister for Homes.

See also

O'Farrell ministry
First Baird ministry
Second Baird ministry
First Berejiklian ministry
Second Berejiklian ministry
Perrottet ministry

References

External links
 Anthony Roberts website

 

|-

1970 births
Living people
Liberal Party of Australia members of the Parliament of New South Wales
Members of the New South Wales Legislative Assembly
University of Technology Sydney alumni
People educated at Saint Ignatius' College, Riverview
21st-century Australian politicians